Dangerous Lies may refer to:
 Dangerous Lies (1921 film), a British silent drama film
 Dangerous Lies (2020 film), an American thriller film